Calvin Augustine Frye (August 24, 1845 – April 26, 1917) was the personal assistant of Mary Baker Eddy (1821–1910), the founder of Christian Science.

Biography

Calvin Frye was born in Frye Village, now part of Andover, Massachusetts. After attending the public school in Andover, Frye was apprenticed as a machinist in Davis & Furber's machine shops in North Andover, where he worked until he joined Eddy. He moved with his family to Lawrence in the early 1860s. When he was 26 years old, Calvin married Ada E. Brush of Lowell, who was visiting in Lawrence, and who attended the same church. She died one year after the marriage, and Frye moved back in with his family.

Calvin and his widowed sister, Lydia Roaf, first became interested in Christian Science through a sister-in-law, Mrs. Oscar Frye. Calvin took a course of instruction under Eddy, after which he, as well as his sister, became practitioners in Lawrence, although he would only be there about a year. Calvin joined Eddy in Boston in 1882, shortly after the death of her husband Asa Eddy. Lydia followed Calvin, and for some time did Eddy's housework. Lydia later returned to Lawrence.

Frye lived in Eddy's homes at 569 Columbus Avenue, Boston, and later at Pleasant View, Concord, New Hampshire, and Chestnut Hill, Massachusetts. He worked as Eddy's secretary, managing her personal affairs, and dealing with her official correspondence. He was reportedly with her practically every day from August 1882, when he joined her household as her chief aide, until she died in December 1910.

Frye became known locally during his lifetime for taking Eddy for a daily ride in a horse-drawn carriage, with Frye dressed in a uniform and top hat sitting next to the coachman. Among critics of the church he is known chiefly for the diary he left behind, which details Eddy's domestic life. Caroline Fraser, the most famous modern critic, called his notebooks "mysterious" in 1999, and claimed that at the time of writing, no outside scholars had been allowed to see the originals. In 2002, Frye's diaries, which number well over 100, were made available to the public through the Mary Baker Eddy Library.

In the hours following Frye's death, John V. Dittemore, a former member of the church's Board of Directors who had become estranged from them, entered Frye's house and removed sections from Frye's diary which he considered most incriminating, he then transcribed, photographed, and burned the originals. He later used the copies to write a critical biography of Eddy with Ernest Sutherland Bates in 1932.

Frye is buried in the West Parish Garden Cemetery in Andover, Massachusetts.

Notes

External links

1845 births
1917 deaths
Christian Science
American Christian Scientists
Converts to Christian Science